= M+S =

M+S may stand for:

- Marks & Spencer, a British multinational retailer
- Mud and snow tires, a category of automotive tires
